The India national beach soccer team represents India in international beach soccer competitions and is controlled by the AIFF, the governing body for football in India.  So far the team has participated at the 2007 AFC Beach Soccer Championship and at the 2008 Asian Beach Games.

Performances

2007 AFC Beach Soccer Championship
India was placed in group with Japan and United Arab Emirates in the 2007 AFC Beach Soccer Championship. India lost both the matches and ended third in group 1.

2008 Asian Beach Games
India was placed in the Group D at 2008 Asian Beach Games. Iran, China and Malaysia were the other teams in Group D. India lost all of their matches and ended fourth in the group. The best match was against China where India lost in penalties (3–2).

See also
 Football in India
 Indian football league system
 Sport in India
 Beach Soccer Worldwide
 FIFA Beach Soccer World Cup
 AFC Beach Soccer Asian Cup

References

External links
 India for the 2007 FIFA Beach Soccer World Cup Football Qualyfiers (kolkatafootball.com)
 FIFA Beach Soccer World Cup 2007 Asian Qualifiers Dubai

beach soccer
Asian national beach soccer teams